German submarine U-163 was a Type IXC U-boat of Nazi Germany's Kriegsmarine built for service during World War II. The keel for this boat was laid down on 8 May 1940 at the DeSchiMAG, Bremen yard as yard number 702. She was launched on 1 May 1941 and commissioned on 21 October under the command of Korvettenkapitän Kurt-Eduard Engelmann.

The U-boat's service began with training as part of the 4th U-boat Flotilla. She then moved to the 10th flotilla on 1 August 1942 for operations. She sank three ships, totalling 15,011 GRT and one warship was declared a total loss (2,000 tons).

She was sunk by a Canadian corvette in March 1943.

Design
German Type IXC submarines were slightly larger than the original Type IXBs. U-163 had a displacement of  when at the surface and  while submerged. She had two shafts and two  propellers.

U-163 was fitted with six  torpedo tubes (four fitted at the bow and two at the stern), 22 torpedoes, one  SK C/32 naval gun, 180 rounds, and a  SK C/30 as well as a  C/30 anti-aircraft gun. The boat had a complement of forty-eight.

Service history

First patrol
The submarine's first patrol took her from Kiel on 21 July 1942, across the North Sea and through the 'gap' between Iceland and the Faroe Islands. She arrived at Lorient, in occupied France, on 16 January. She would be based at this Atlantic port for the rest of her career. She had crossed the Atlantic Ocean and sailed to the southern Cuban coast.

Second patrol
Her second foray took her to the area north of South America. She also damaged an American gunboat,  on 12 November and sank Empire Starling northeast of Barbados on the 21st. Her final victim on this patrol was Apóide which went down a day later. She returned to Lorient on 6 January 1943.

Third patrol and Loss
The U-boat departed Lorient for the last time on 10 March 1943.

Summary of raiding history

References

Notes

Citations

Bibliography

External links

German Type IX submarines
U-boats commissioned in 1941
U-boats sunk in 1943
World War II submarines of Germany
World War II shipwrecks in the Atlantic Ocean
1941 ships
Ships built in Bremen (state)
U-boats sunk by depth charges
Ships lost with all hands
U-boats sunk by Canadian warships
Maritime incidents in March 1943